Mary Lemon Waller (born Mary Lemon Fowler) (1851–1931) was a British portrait painter, who specialised in child portraits.

Biography 

Mary Lemon was born to Rev. Hugh Fowler of Burnwood, Gloucestershire.  She began her education in art at an Art School in Gloucester, and later studied at the Royal Academy schools. Waller began exhibiting paintings as early as age 20, and exhibited at the Royal Academy from 1877–1904. She married genre painter Samuel Edmund Waller in 1874; the couple lived in London and had one son. Waller exhibited her work at the Palace of Fine Arts at the 1893 World's Columbian Exposition in Chicago, Illinois. In 1925, Waller became a member of the Royal Society of Portrait Painters.

Waller's works can be seen at several venues in the United Kingdom: Cragside, Royal Hallamshire Hospital, Literary and Philosophical Society of Newcastle upon Tyne, Oxford University Museum of Natural History, and Somerville College, Oxford.

Exhibitions 
 Royal Academy Schools
 Royal Society of Portrait Painters
 Society of Women Artists
 Walker Art Gallery
 Royal Institute of Oil Painters
 Dudley Museum and Art Gallery
 Grosvenor Gallery
 Manchester City Art Gallery
 Royal Scottish Academy

References

External links 

 
 Mary Lemon Waller on MutualArt.com
 Mary Lemon Waller on Artnet.com

1851 births
1931 deaths
19th-century English painters
20th-century English painters
19th-century English women artists
20th-century English women artists
Alumni of the Royal Academy Schools
English portrait painters
English women painters
Artists  from Bideford